Bernard Häring, CSsR (10 November 1912 – 3 July 1998) was a German moral theologian and a Redemptorist priest in the Catholic Church.

Life

Häring was born at Böttingen in Germany to a peasant family. At the age of 12, he entered the seminary.  Later, he took vows as a member of the Congregation of the Most Holy Redeemer, was ordained a priest, and sent as a missionary to Brazil. He studied moral theology in obedience to his superiors.

During World War II, he was conscripted by the German army and served as a medic. Although forbidden from performing priestly functions by the Nazi authorities, he brought the sacraments to Catholic soldiers.

In 1954, he came to fame as a moral theologian with his three volume, The Law of Christ.  The work received ecclesiastical approval but was written in a style different from the Manual Tradition. It was translated into more than 12 languages.

Between 1949 and 1987, he taught moral theology at Alphonsian Academy in Rome.

Häring taught at various universities including the University of San Francisco, Fordham, Yale, Brown, Temple, and the Kennedy Institute for Bioethics at Georgetown.

A prolific writer, Häring produced about 80 books and 1,000 articles.

He died of a stroke at the age of 85 at Haag in Oberbayern, Germany.

Häring established himself as a leader in moving Catholic moral theology to a more personalist and scripture-based approach.

Dialogical approach to Catholic moral theology
Bernard Häring, presents a dialogical approach to Catholic moral theology in his trilogies The Law of Christ and Free and Faithful in Christ. In this approach, morality follows the pattern of faith necessitating a dialogue. This approach to morality rests on the person's conscience that acknowledges God as basis of value. "God speaks in many ways to awaken, deepen and strengthen faith, hope, love and the spirit of adoration. We are believers to the extent that, in all of reality and in all events that touch us, we perceive a gift and a call from God."

Selected works
  [German 1954]. 3 Vols.
 
 
 
 
 
 
 
 
 
 
 
  ( 3 Vols.)

References

External links 

Obituary in NYT

1912 births
1998 deaths
People from Tuttlingen (district)
20th-century German Catholic theologians
Christian ethicists
Redemptorists
Roman Catholic moral theologians
German male non-fiction writers
Participants in the Second Vatican Council
Commanders Crosses of the Order of Merit of the Federal Republic of Germany
Recipients of the Order of Merit of Baden-Württemberg
20th-century German Roman Catholic priests